Nasir is a 2020 Tamil-language Drama film directed by Arun Karthick and is an Indo-Dutch co-production between Stray Factory, Rinkel Film, Uncombed Buddha, Magic Hour Films, Colored Pickle film & Harman Ventures. The Hollywood Reporter described the film as "An observational chronicle of one seemingly ordinary day in the life of a seemingly ordinary sari salesman in the southern city of Coimbatore," with a focus on tolerance and human values. The movie's poster is inspired by the outline of Gandhipuram.

Nasir was the recipient of the Hubert Bals Fund in 2018 The film premiered at the International Film Festival of Rotterdam in Tiger Competition and won the NETPAC award for Best Asian Film premiering at the Festival It also bagged the Grand Prix at the 14th Andrei Tarkovsky Zerkalo International Film Festival, Russia. It won the Golden Wood in the Asian Arthouse Film Festival, 2021, Kolkata.

Cast 
 Koumarane Valavane as Nasir
 Sudha Ranganathan as Tal

References

External links 
 

Indian drama films
Films about Islam